Hindu views of homosexuality and LGBT (lesbian, gay, bisexual, and transgender) issues more generally are diverse, and different Hindu groups have distinct views. 

A number of Hindu texts have portrayed homosexual experience as natural and joyful, the Kamasutra affirms and recognises same-sex relations, and there are several Hindu temples which have carvings that depict both men and women engaging in homosexual acts. There are also numerous Hindu deities that are shown to be gender-fluid and falling into the LGBT spectrum. Same-sex relations and gender variance have been represented within Hinduism from the Vedic times through to the present day, in rituals, law books, religious or narrative mythologies, commentaries, paintings, and even sculptures.

The Arthashastra argues that some homosexual intercourse is an offence,  and encourages chastity (however, this also applies to heterosexual intercourse). The Dharmashastra recognises, albeit reluctantly, the existence of homosexuality, without openly condemning it in religious or moral terms. The Manusmriti regards homosexual (as well as heterosexual) acts in an ox cart as a source of ritual pollution, something to be expiated by Brahmin males through ritual immersion. 

In 2009, the Delhi High Court legalised homosexuality in India, but the Supreme Court of India subsequently overturned the high court's decision. The Supreme Court of India, in a later ruling in 2018, reversed its previous verdict and decriminalised homosexual intercourse and relationships.

Contemporary Hindu society

Sexuality is rarely discussed openly in contemporary Hindu society, especially in modern India where homosexuality was illegal until a brief period beginning in 1860, due to colonial British laws. In 2009, The Delhi High Court in a historic judgement decriminalised homosexuality in India; where the court noted that the existing laws violated fundamental rights to personal liberty (Article 21 of the Indian Constitution) and equality (Article 14) and prohibition of discrimination (Article 15). However, the Supreme Court of India re-affirmed the penal code provision and overturned the Delhi High Court decision, effectively re-instating the legal ban on homosexuality in which penalties included life imprisonment until September 6, 2018 when Supreme Court of India decriminalised homosexuality. Furthermore, LGBT people are often subjected to torture, executions and fines by non-government affiliated vigilante groups.

Hinduism is not known to ban homosexuality. Hindu nationalist factions have a varied opinion on the legalisation of homosexuality. In the last thirty years, homosexuality has become increasingly visible in the print and audio-visual media, with many out LGBT people, an active LGBT movement, and a large Indian LGBT presence on the Internet. From the 1990s onward, modern gay and lesbian Hindu organizations have surfaced in India's major cities and in 2004, plausible calls were made for the first time to repeal India's laws against homosexuality.

Deepa Mehta's 1996 film Fire, which depicts a romantic relationship between two Hindu women, was informally banned for "religious insensitivity" after the screening of the movie was disrupted on the grounds that it denigrated Indian culture, not on the grounds of homophobia per se, a position shared and confirmed by feminist Madhu Kishwar. In addition, Bharatiya Janata Party who were in power in India at the time, refused to ban it. Similar protests occurred in 2004 against the lesbian-themed film Girlfriend — even though the portrayal of lesbianism was this time distinctly unsympathetic. Several human-rights groups such as the People's Union for Civil Liberties have asserted that sexual minorities in India face severe discrimination and violence, especially those from rural and lower-caste backgrounds.

In her book, Love's Rite, Ruth Vanita examines the phenomenon of same-sex weddings, many by Hindu rites, which have been reported by the Indian press over the last thirty years and with increasing frequency. In the same period, same-sex joint suicides have also been reported. Most of these marriages and suicides are by lower-middle-class female couples from small towns and rural areas across the country; these women have no contact with any LGBT movements. Both cross-sex and same-sex couples, when faced with family opposition, tend to resort to either elopement and marriage or to joint suicide in the hope of reunion in the next life. Vanita examines how Hindu doctrines such as rebirth and the genderlessness of the soul are often interpreted to legitimize socially disapproved relationships, including same-sex ones. In a 2004 survey, most — though not all — swamis said they opposed the concept of a Hindu-sanctified gay marriage. But several Hindu priests have performed same-sex marriages, arguing that love is the result of attachments from previous births and that marriage, as a union of spirit, is transcendental to gender.

Later, Vanita condenses the ideas in her book into an article, "Same-sex Weddings, Hindu Traditions and Modern India". Here, she summarizes specific cases in which women specifically committed joint-suicides, were married and separated, or successfully married. She points out three different "forces that have helped female couples". These are: the law courts, the media, and some Hindu authorities (such as the swamis mentioned earlier in this article) from her book.  When female couples can stay together under the social pressures and get to the courts, the courts generally hold up their decisions, holding to the fact that the women are consenting adults. While this does not necessarily stop the harassment, it does lend the couple further legitimacy under the laws. In addition, the more successful same-sex marriages of women are those in which the women are financially independent. If they have social support from their families and community—for the most part—then they may be able to live in peace together. The media may also play an important role in same-sex marriages. In drawing attention to their marriages, women who do not necessarily know about LGBT rights groups may be contacted and supported by those groups after media attention. However, the flip side of this is that the anti-LGBT groups also may reach out against their marriage.

Psychoanalyst Sudhir Kakar writes that Hindus are more accepting of "deviance or eccentricity" that are adherents of Western religions, who typically treat sexual variance as "anti-social or psychopathological, requiring 'correction' or 'cure'". Hindus, he argues, believe instead that each individual must fulfill their personal destiny (svadharma) as they travel the path towards moksha (transcendence).

Commenting on the legalisation of homosexuality in India; Anil Bhanot, general secretary of The United Kingdom Hindu Council said: "The point here is that the homosexual nature is part of the natural law of God; it should be accepted for what it is, no more and no less. Hindus are generally conservative but it seems to me that in ancient India, they even celebrated sex as an enjoyable part of procreation, where priests were invited for ceremonies in their home to mark the beginning of the process."

A high-ranking member of the influential right-wing Hindu group Rashtriya Swayamsevak Sangh (RSS) has publicly stated that he does not believe homosexuality should be illegal, and that the RSS had no official stance on this issue since it was a matter of personal preference. After the Supreme Court of India struck down parts of Section 377 of the Indian Penal Code, the RSS stated that while relationships between people of the same gender are unnatural, it is not a criminal act. In its latest position, the RSS has accepted that people from the LGBT community are an integral part of the Indian society.

The third gender
Hindu philosophy has the concept of a third sex or third gender (Sansktiy: तृतीय प्रकृति, tŕtīya-prakŕti – literally, "third nature"). This category includes a wide range of people with mixed male and female natures such as effeminate males, masculine females, transgender people, transsexual people, intersex people, androgynes, and so on. Many MTF third-genders are not attracted only or at all to men, but are attracted either exclusively to women or are bisexual. Many FTM transgender people are attracted to men.  Such persons are not considered fully male or female in traditional Hinduism, being a combination of both. They are mentioned as third sex by nature (birth) and are not expected to behave like cisgender men and women. They often keep their own societies or town quarters, perform specific occupations (such as masseurs, hairdressers, flower-sellers, domestic servants, etc.) and are generally attributed a semi-divine status. Their participation in religious ceremonies, especially as cross-dressing dancers and devotees of certain temple gods/goddesses, is considered auspicious in traditional Hinduism. Some Hindus believe that third-sex people have special powers allowing them to bless or curse others. 

In 2008, the state of Tamil Nadu recognised the "Third Gender"; with its civil supplies department giving in the ration card a provision for a new sex column as 'T', distinct from the usual 'M' and 'F' for males and females respectively. This was the first time that authorities anywhere in India have officially recognised the third gender.

Hindu religious narratives

In the Hindu narrative tradition, stories of gods and mortals changing gender occur. Sometimes they also engage in heterosexual activities as different reincarnated genders. Homosexual and transgender Hindus commonly identify with and worship the various Hindu deities connected with gender diversity such as Ardhanarisvara (the androgynous form of Shiva and his consort Parvati), Aravan (a hero whom the god Krishna married after becoming a woman), Harihara (an incarnation of Shiva and Vishnu combined), Bahuchara Mata (a goddess connected with transsexuality and eunuchism), Gadadhara (an incarnation of Radha in male form), Chandi-Chamunda (twin warrior goddesses), Bhagavati-devi (a Hindu goddess associated with cross-dressing), Gangamma (a goddess connected with cross-dressing and disguises) and the goddess Yellamma. There are also specific festivals connected to the worship of these deities, some of which are famous in India for their cross-dressing devotees. These festivals include the Aravan Festival of Koovagam, the Bahuchara Mata Festivals of Gujarat and the Yellamma Festivals of Karnataka, among others. Deities displaying gender variance include Mohini, the female avatar of the god Vishnu and Vaikuntha Kamalaja, the androgynous form of Vishnu and his consort Lakshmi.

LGBT interpretations are also drawn in the legends of birth of the deities Ayyappa (a god born from the union of Shiva and Mohini), Bhagiratha (an Indian king born of two female parents) and Kartikeya (where the fire-god Agni "swallows" the semen of Shiva after disturbing his coitus with his consort Parvati). Some homosexual Hindus also worship the gods Mitra and Varuna, who are associated with two lunar phases and same-sex relations in ancient Brahmana texts.

Gender variance is also observed in heroes in Hindu scriptures. The Hindu epic Mahabharata narrates that the hero Arjuna takes a vow to live as a member of the third sex for a year as the result of a curse he is compelled to honor. He thus transforms into Brihannala, a member of the third gender, for a year and becomes a dance teacher to a princess. Another important character, Shikhandi, is born female, but raised as a man and even married to a woman. She becomes male due to the grace of a Yaksha. Shikhandi eventually becomes the reason for the death of the warrior Bhishma, who refuses to fight a "woman." Another character, Bhishma appeases Yudhishtira's curiosity about relative enjoyment of partners during sex by relating the story of King Bhangasvana, who has had a hundred sons is turned into a woman while on a hunt. She returns to her kingdom, relates the story, turns the kingdom over to her children and retires to the forest to be the spouse of a hermit, by whom she has a hundred more sons. Ila, a king from Hindu narratives, is also known for their gender changes.

Some versions of the Krittivasa Ramayana, the most popular Bengali text on the pastimes of Ramachandra (an incarnation of Vishnu), relate a story of two queens who conceived a child together. When the king of the Sun Dynasty, Maharaja Dilipa, died, the demigods become concerned that he did not have a son to continue his line. Shiva, therefore, appeared before the king's two widowed queens and commanded them, "You two make love together and by my blessings, you will bear a beautiful son." The two wives, with great affection for each other, executed Shiva's order until one of them conceived a child. The sage Astavakra accordingly named the child "Bhagiratha" – he who was born from two vulvas. Bhagiratha later became a king and is credited with bringing the river Ganges down to earth through his austerities.

Hindu texts

People of a third gender (tritiya-prakriti), not fully men nor women, are mentioned here and there throughout Hindu texts such as the Puranas but are not specifically defined. In general, they are portrayed as effeminate men, often cowardly, and with no desire for women. Modern readers often draw parallels between these and modern stereotypes of lesbian, gay, bisexual and transgender people. However, Hindu texts (Mostly Dharmasastras) such as the Manusmriti,  Vide Atri Smřti, Vide Baudhāyana Dharmasūtra, and the Vide Apastambha Dharmasūtra do treat homosexuality as a sin, in some cases legally punishable. In addition, each Hindu denomination had developed distinct rules regarding sexuality, as Hinduism is not a monolith and is decentralized in essence.

Historians Ruth Vanita and Saleem Kidwai, in their book Same-Sex Love in India: Readings from Literature and History, compiled extracts from Indian texts, from ancient to modern times, including many Hindu texts, translated from 15 Indian languages. In their accompanying analytical essays, they also wrote that Hindu texts have discussed and debated same-sex desire from the earliest times, in tones ranging from critical to non-judgmental to playful and celebratory.

Mythologist Devdutt Pattanaik summarizes the place of homosexuality in Hindu literature as follows: "though not part of the mainstream, its existence was acknowledged but not approved."  Other Indologists assert that homosexuality was not approved for brahmanas or the twice-born but accepted among other castes.

In his book, Tritiya-Prakriti: People of the Third Sex, Vaishnava monk Amara Das Wilhelm demonstrates how ancient expressions of Hinduism accommodated homosexual and transgender persons much more positively than we see in India today: "Early Vedic teachings stressed responsible family life and asceticism but also tolerated different types of sexualities within general society."

Mahanirvana Tantra
The Mahanirvana Tantra exclude the third-gendered from the right of inheritance, although establishing they have the right to be financially supported by their family.

Kama Sutra

The Kama Sutra is an ancient text dealing with kama or desire (of all kinds), which in Hindu thought is one of the four normative and spiritual goals of life. The Kama Sutra is the earliest extant and most important work in the Kama Shastra tradition of Sanskrit literature. It was compiled by the philosopher Vatsyayana around the 4th century, from earlier texts, and describes homosexual practices in several places, as well as a range of sex/gender 'types'. The author acknowledges that these relations also involve love and a bond of trust.

The author describes techniques by which masculine and feminine types of the third sex (tritiya-prakriti), as well as women, perform fellatio. The Second Part, Ninth Chapter of Kama Sutra specifically describes two kinds of men that we would recognize today as masculine- and feminine-type homosexuals but which are mentioned in older, Victorian British translations as simply "eunuchs."  The chapter describes their appearances – feminine types dressed up as women whereas masculine types maintained muscular physiques and grew small beards, mustaches, etc. – and their various professions as masseurs, barbers and prostitutes are all described. Such homosexual men were also known to marry, according to the Kama Sutra: "There are also third-sex citizens, sometimes greatly attached to one another and with complete faith in one another, who get married together." (KS 2.9.36). In the "Jayamangala" of Yashodhara, an important twelfth-century commentary on the Kama Sutra, it is also stated: "Citizens with this kind of homosexual inclination, who renounce women and can do without them willingly because they love one another, get married together, bound by a deep and trusting friendship."

After describing fellatio as performed between men of the third sex, the Sutra then mentions the practice as an act between men and women, wherein the homosexuals' acts are scorned, especially for Brahmanas. (KS 2.9.37)

The Kama Sutra also refers to svairini, who are "independent women who frequent their own kind or others" (2.8.26) — or, in another passage: "the liberated woman, or svairini, is one who refuses a husband and has relations in her own home or in other houses" (6.6.50). In a famous commentary on the Kama Sutra from the 12th century, Jayamangala, explains: "A woman known for her independence, with no sexual bars, and acting as she wishes, is called svairini. She makes love with her own kind. She strokes her partner at the point of union, which she kisses." (Jayamangala on Kama Sutra 2.8.13). The various practices of lesbians are described in detail within the Second Part, Eighth Chapter of the Kama Sutra.

Others
There are other ancient Hindu/Sanskrit texts that refer to homosexuality. The Sushruta Samhita, for example, a highly respected Hindu medical text dating back to at least 600 B.C., mentions two different types of homosexual men (kumbhika – men who take the passive role in anal sex; and asekya – men who devour the semen of other men) as well as transgender people (sandha – men with the qualities, behavior and speech of women). It also states that men who behave like women, or women who behave like men, are determined as such at the time of their conception in the womb. (SS 3.2.42–43) The Sushruta Samhita also mentions the possibility of two women uniting and becoming pregnant as a result of the mingling of their sexual fluids. It states that the child born of such a union will be "boneless."  Such a birth is indeed described in the Krittivasa Ramayana of Bengal (see below).

Other texts list the various types of men who are impotent with women (known in Sanskrit as sandha, kliba, napumsaka, and panda). The Sabda-kalpa-druma Sanskrit-Sanskrit dictionary, for instance, lists twenty types, as does the Kamatantra and Smriti-Ratnavali of Vacaspati (14th century). The Narada Smriti similarly lists fourteen different types. Included among the lists are transgender people (sandha), intersex people (nisarga), and three different types of homosexual men (mukhebhaga, kumbhika and asekya). Such texts demonstrate that third-sex terms like sandha and napumsaka actually refer to many different types of "men who are impotent with women," and that simplistic definition such as "eunuch" or "neuter" may not always be accurate and in some cases totally incorrect. In his article Homosexuality and Hinduism, Arvind Sharma expresses his doubt over the common English translation of words like kliba into "eunuch" as follows: "The limited practice of castration in India raises another point significant for the rest of the discussion, namely, whether rendering a word such as "kliba" as "eunuch" regularly is correct..."

The Arthashastra of Kautilya represents the principle text of secular law and illustrates the attitude of the judiciary towards sexual matters. Heterosexual vaginal sex is proposed as the norm by this text and legal issues arising from deviation therefrom are punishable by fines and in extreme cases by capital punishment. Homosexual acts are cited as a small offence punishable by a fine. It punishes non-vaginal sex with a small fine (4; 23; 326); however, women are fined less than men. 

The digest or dharmanibandha work "Dandaviveka'" written by Vardhamana Upadhyaya in 15th century in Mithila pronounced that semen shouldn't ejaculate outside the vagina. Ayoni sex here is divided into two categories, one which includes intercourse with humans of both genders.

The Narada Purana in 1.15.936 states that those who have non-vaginal intercourse will go to Retobhojana where they have to live on semen. Ruth Vanita states that the punishment in the afterlife suggested by it is comical and befitting the act. The Skanda Purana states that those who indulge in such acts will acquire impotency.

Dharmsastras

The Dharmsastras especially later ones prescribed against non-vaginal sex like the Vashistha Dharmasutra. The Yājñavalkya Smṛti prescribes fines for such acts including those with other men.

The Manusmriti is less judgmental about LGBT relationships. XI. 174 prescribes eating the five products of the cow or Panchagavya and foregoing food for a night for several sexual acts committed by a man including those with other men. XI. 175 states that those men who engage in intercourse with a man should take a bath while being clothed. According to XI.68, a man who engages in such acts is traditionally considered to lose his caste, though Ruth Vanita suggests the prescriptions by Manusmriti act as a substitute.

Verses 8.369-370 of Manusmriti which prescribe punishment for a female having intercourse with a maiden are wrongly thought to be against same-sex activity between females by some modern authors like Wendy Doniger. However, verse 8.367 contains a similar punishment for all those who do it regardless of gender. The emphasis Vanita states here is on a maiden's sexual purity.

Third-gender Hindu sects
Below are listed some of the most common third-gender sects found in Hinduism. There are an estimated half million crossdressing "eunuchs" in modern-day India, associated with various sects, temples and Hindu deities.  Despite being called "eunuchs", the majority of these persons (91%) do not practice castration but are more accurately associated with transgender.

The Hijra

The Hijras are a third-gender group in the Indian subcontinent. Some of them undergo castration, which is connected to Bahuchara Mata who is identified with the earth goddess. According to legends, she cut off her breasts in order to avoid rape by a group of bandits. The operation is termed by them nirvan. They compare it with tapas which consists of avoiding sex. Also used to justify emasculation is a creation myth of Shiva who emasculated himself. The aravanis also undergo castration. Hijras also use Arjuna becoming a eunuch during exile as a result of a curse as a justification for castration. Despite this, all the seven major hijra clans are claimed to have been established by Muslims.

There are an estimated 50,000 hijra in northern India. After interviewing and studying the hijra for many years, Serena Nanda writes in her book, Neither Man Nor Woman: The hijras of India, as follows: "There is a widespread belief in India that hijras are born hermaphrodites [intersex] and are taken away by the hijra community at birth or in childhood, but I found no evidence to support this belief among the hijras I met, all of whom joined the community voluntarily, often in their teens." Nanda also states: "There is absolutely no question that at least some hijras – perhaps even the majority – are homosexual prostitutes. Sinha's (1967) study of hijras in Lucknow, in North India, acknowledges the hijra role as performers, but views the major motivation for recruitment to the hijra community as the satisfaction of the individual's homosexual urges..." The hijras especially worship Bahuchara, the Hindu goddess presiding over transsexuality.

The Aravani or Ali

The most numerous third-gender sect (estimated at 150,000) is the aravani or ali of Tamil Nadu in southern India. The aravanis are typically transgender and their main festival, the popular Koovagam or Aravan Festival celebrated in late April/early May, is attended by thousands, including many transgender people and homosexuals. The aravani worship the Hindu god, Aravan, and do not practice any system of castration.

The Jogappa
A lesser-known third-gender sect in India is the jogappa of South India (Karnataka and Andhra Pradesh), a group similarly associated with prostitution. The jogappa are connected with the goddess Yellamma (Renuka), and include both transgender people and homosexuals. Both serve as dancers and prostitutes, and they are usually in charge of the temple devadasis (maidservants of the goddess who similarly serve as dancers and female courtesans). Large festivals are celebrated at these temples wherein hundreds of scantily-clad devadasis and jogappas parade through the streets. The jogappa do not practice castration.

Religious art

Medieval Hindu temples such as those at Khajuraho depict sexual acts in sculptures on the external walls. Some of these scenes involve same-sex sexuality:
 A sculpture at the Kandariya Mahadeva temple in Khajuraho portrays a man reaching out to another's erect penis.
 An orgiastic group of three women and one man, on the southern wall of the Kandariya Mahadeva temple in Khajuraho. One of the women is caressing another.
 At the Lakshmana temple in Khajuraho (954 CE), a man receives fellatio from a seated male as part of an orgiastic scene.
 At the Rajarani Temple in Bhubaneswar, Odisha, dating from the 10th or 11th century, a sculpture depicts two women engaged in oral sex.
 A 12th-century Shiva temple in Bagali, Karnataka depicts a scene of apparent oral sex between two males on a sculpture below the shikhara.
 At Padhavli near Gwalior, a ruined temple from the 10th century shows a man within an orgiastic group receiving fellatio from another male.
 An 11th-century lifesize sandstone sculpture from Odisha, now in the Seattle Art Museum, shows Kama, the god of love, shooting a flower tipped arrow at two women who are embracing one another.

See also

 Homosexuality in India
 Kama
 LGBT Rights in India
 LGBT Rights in Sri Lanka
 LGBT topics and the Hare Krishna movement
 Non-westernized concepts of male sexuality
 Tamil Sexual Minorities

References

Further reading
Gandhi's Tiger and Sita's Smile: Essays on Gender, Sexuality and Culture by Ruth Vanita. Yoda Press, 2005.
Homosexuality and World Religions by Arlene Swidler. Trinity Press International.
Love's Rite: Same-Sex Marriage in India and the West by Ruth Vanita. Penguin Books India, 2005.
Neither Man Nor Woman: The Hijras of India by Serena Nanda. Wadsworth Publishing Co., 1999.
Same-Sex Love In India: Readings from Literature and History by Ruth Vanita and Saleem Kidwai. Palgrave, 2001.
The Complete Kama Sutra by Alain Danielou. Park Street Press, 1994.
The Man Who Was a Woman and Other Queer Tales from Hindu Lore by Devdutt Pattanaik. Harrington Park Press, 2002.
Third Sex, Third Gender: Beyond Sexual Dimorphism in Culture and History by Gilbert Herdt. Zone Books, 1993.

External links

The Gay and Lesbian Vaishnava Association – Information and support for GLBTI Vaishnavas and Hindus.
'Hinduism does not condemn homosexuality'
Pink Pages, India's National Gay and Lesbian Magazine - Interview of Amara Das Wilhelm, founder of GALVA.

LGBT in India